Inscryption is a roguelike deck-building game developed by Daniel Mullins Games and published by Devolver Digital. Inscryption was released for Windows on October 19, 2021. It was released on Linux and macOS on June 22, 2022, which was followed by PlayStation 4 and 5 versions in August. A Nintendo Switch port was released in December 2022. Inscryption received generally positive reviews and won several Game of the Year awards. The game sold 1 million copies by January 2022.

As a metafictional game, Inscryption involves found footage as the player watches the experiences of a vlogger that stumbled across a video game called Inscryption, which holds a number of strange secrets. As the player interacts with a mysterious dealer in a dark cabin, they find further secrets that expose more of the history of the fictional Inscryption. The game was initially a prototype that Daniel Mullins had created for a Ludum Dare game jam with the theme of "Sacrifices must be made". Initially, Mullins created a card game where sacrificing cards already played became the central mechanic. After publishing the prototype to itch.io and receiving positive response, Mullins expanded the game, expanding on both the card game and adding escape the room-style elements. An official mod was released in March 2022 that allowed players to play a version of the game that focused only on the card game without the additional puzzle elements.

Plot 
In the game's found footage, the vlogger Luke "The Lucky Carder" Carder films himself opening packs of an out-of-print card game called Inscryption. One card has coordinates written on it, located nearby, and there, Carder finds a box with a floppy disc titled Inscryption. After preparing his computer to run it, he finds he cannot start a "New Game" and is forced to start from the "Continue Game" state.

In-game, Carder's player-character interacts with a shadowy, hostile dealer named Leshy within a cabin. When Carder's character loses, Leshy uses a magic camera to capture the character into a new "death card" that appears in later games. Between rounds, Carder's character can move about the cabin, finding three cards that speak to him: the Stoat, the Stinkbug, and the Stunted Wolf, all three who guide the character to locate a roll of film in the room. Once the character defeats Leshy, they steal the camera and use the film to capture Leshy onto a death card. Searching the room reveals the missing "New Game" button, which after collecting resets the game to a fresh state.

Carder finds that the game now is presented as a traditional pixel art RPG, where the characters travels the world to collect cards as to challenge the four Scrybes: Leshy, the Scrybe of Beasts, P03, the Scrybe of Technology, Grimora, the Scrybe of the Dead, and Magnificus, the Scrybe of Magicks. During this segment, Carder finds that Leshy had previously taken over the game and captured P03, Grimora, and Magnificus as the cards Stoat, Stinkbug, and Stunted Wolf. Once the character defeats each Scrybe, they go to challenge one Scrybe to replace, but regardless of their choice, P03 appears and lets the player defeat them, which allows P03 to take over the game.

During his playing, Carder attempts to contact Inscryption developer, GameFuna, but receives a demand to return the game, followed by a visit from a representative reinforcing that demand, which Carder refuses. He also learns that a GameFuna developer named Kaycee Hobbes mysteriously died while working on the game; she had previously appeared as a spirit in Grimora's area and as a death card in Leshy's original cabin.

Carder returns to play after P03's takeover, finding that the character is now trapped in a factory by P03. P03 forces the character to help in achieving the "Great Transcendence" by defeating "Uberbots"; in these fights, Carder agrees to grant the game access to his computer as to win the battles. After defeating the last Uberbot, P03 reveals that this was a ploy to gain access to upload Inscryption to a digital game storefront, but before the process completes, Leshy, Grimora, and Magnificus appear and disable P03, ending his plan. As the three Scrybes work to reset the game to its default state, Grimora uses the opportunity to wipe the Inscryption disk clean, including the "OLD_DATA" that would be dangerous for Carder to look at. The three Scrybes each have a final card battle with Carder before they are deleted. Carder finds the OLD_DATA still present and looks at its contents, causing him to attempt to destroy the Inscryption disk by smashing it with a hammer.

After the game is deleted, Carder, exhausted from what he had learned and endured contacts Herman, a journalist from the Herald. He explains that the game took control of his computer and states that he has video footage that may help expose the wrongdoings of the GameFuna company. However, Carder is interrupted by the GameFuna representative, who returns to Carder's house and shoots him in the head, presumably killing him. The final shot of the game is of Carder bleeding out on the floor as the representative enters his house to retrieve the remains of the Inscryption disk.

Alternate reality game 
A real-world alternate reality game (ARG), embedded both in video from the game and outside of it, led to additional information related to Inscryption backstory. In this ARG, it was revealed that Kaycee had gotten possession of the "Karnoffel Code", a computer algorithm reportedly created by the Soviets during the Cold War after gaining possession of Adolf Hitler's corpse and discovering a connection between him, the game of Karnoffel, and the occult. A spy named Barry Wilkinson had gotten a copy of the Karnoffel Code from the Soviets and hid it on a floppy disc among other empty floppies, which eventually fell into possession of Kaycee. The ARG revealed a postscript to the game which shows Carder's computer turning back on by itself and beginning the uploading process of Inscryption to a digital storefront worldwide, then ending with a winking ASCII image of P03/the Stoat, aware its plans of transcendence had worked. Parts of the ARG point to narrative connection between events in Inscryption and Mullins' previous game, The Hex (itself a similar meta-narrative game about video game development), with characters from The Hex helping P03 or GameFuna.

Gameplay 

Inscryption is a roguelike deck-building game. The game itself is broken into three acts, where the nature of this deck-building game changes, but the fundamental rules of how the card game is played remains the same. The card game is played on a 3x4 grid which is later expanded to a 3x5 grid during the third act; the player plays their cards into the bottom row, while their opponent plays cards ahead of time into the top row, and then are automatically moved into play into the middle row on the next turn. Each card has an attack and health value. On either the player's or opponent's turn, after their cards are played, each of their cards attacks their opponent's card in the same column, dealing their attack value to that card's health, and if that reduces the health to zero or less, that card is removed. If the attacking card is unopposed, then the card attacks the opponent directly with that much damage. Damage is tracked on a weighing scale using teeth for each damage taken by that player. The goal is to tip the opponent's side of the scale by a difference of five teeth before they can do the same to the player's side. In addition to attack value, each card has various sigils representing special abilities such as the ability to fly past a blocker or to attack multiple columns each turn.

To play cards, each has a cost to play them which depends on which of the Scrybes created that card. Those created by P03 use energy, which the player starts at 1 energy bar at the start of each game, refilling and gaining an additional bar each turn. Those created by Leshy require a blood sacrifice from cards already in play on the board. The cards from Grimora require bone tokens, earned when cards are defeated or sacrificed. Cards from Magnificus require one of three gems to be present on the board to be played and remain in the game, and are lost if the gem leaves play.

During the game's first act, in which Leshy has taken over the Inscryption code, the player sees the game from the first person perspective, facing against Leshy in his cabin, though this information is not told to the player. During this act, the game plays as a roguelike deck-building game, where the player is given a simple starting deck, based only on Leshy's and Grimora's card types, and then proceeds through four randomly-generated maps of various encounters presented by Leshy, which include card battles with Leshy and opportunities to add or remove cards from their deck, or gain items that can be used during card battles to tip the odds in their favor. Each of the first three maps ends with a mini-boss encounter, while the final map is a battle with Leshy. If the player loses twice on a map, or once during a boss battle, they are taken by Leshy and made into a death card with his camera, which can appear on later runs. Between encounters, the player can also get up from the table and look around the cabin, solving puzzles similar to an escape room, discovering clues to locate the card forms of P03, Grimora, and Magnificus to help the player beat Leshy, bringing the game into the second act.

During the second act, representing the original version of Inscryption, the game is now presented as a pixel art-stylized top-down role-playing game, similar to Pokémon. The player is instructed to pick one of the four Scrybes to replace, and then must explore the game's overworld to collect card packs to expand their card collection and build twenty-card decks with which to challenge each of the other four Scrybes and their various underlings in card battle. In this act, cards from all four Scrybes are available to collect, and decks can consist of cards from each of the four Scrybes. During this phase, the player can lose a card game without any penalty but simply do not progress the story. Once the player has completed the full story missions within this act, the game moves into the third act.

The third act is similar in style to the first act as a roguelike deckbuilder, but now the player faces against P03 in a robot factory as P03 takes over the Inscryption code to try to achieve transcendence on the Internet. P03 and its underlings have access to several of the death cards that the player may have created during prior runs of the first act, making battles in this phase more challenging. Player progresses through various encounters by moving through a series of rooms in a grid-like layout, similar to The Binding of Isaac, with battle encounters occurring between rooms while other encounters to gain, improve or remove cards taking place within the rooms themselves. While losing a card match in this act does not restart the game, players must reach specific checkpoints on the map to retain progress and prevent previously defeated enemies from respawning and to build up in-game currency to improve their cards.

Development 

The game started as a small project that Daniel Mullins built during the Ludum Dare 43 game jam in 2018, where the theme was "sacrifices must be made". At the time, Mullins had gotten back into Magic: The Gathering and took influence from the sacrifice mechanic there to create the approach where the player would sacrifice creatures to play other ones. This idea extended to the player virtually sacrificing parts of their own body as well to influence the game with negative effects that may come from that, such as sacrificing an eye that would limit their field of view. His entry to the game jam was thus named Sacrifices Must Be Made after the jam's theme. Following the game jam, Mullins put the game up at itch.io, where it drew interest from players in early 2019. As he had just finished releasing The Hex, Mullins decided to expand out Sacrifices Must Be Made into a full game. Initially, Mullins had considered expanding the game out into an anthology work as he did not immediate see a path for fleshing out the Ludum Dare version into a full game, but as he came up with ideas for this larger game, he saw a route to expand out the base game in multiple directions, including the incorporation of full-motion video.

Leshy is based on the Slavic mythology entity of the same name; Mullins had considered that the dealer was a type of "forest demon" and while searching online, came across the mythos of Leshy, which he believed felt well with the horror theme of the game. From there, the other three Scrybes fell out as he had compared them to Pokémon gym leaders, each with a different theme; since Leshy was associated with beasts, the other three were associated with robots (P03), wizards (Magnificus), and the undead (Grimora). Mullins recognized that the game spends most of its time around Leshy and P03's stories, but felt that it would have made the game too long to include additional acts to explore Grimora's or Magnificus's backgrounds, though made Grimora central to the game's conclusion.

Daniel Mullins Games released a free update in December 2021 that included a beta version of a mini-expansion to the game called "Kaycee's Mod". In this mode, the roguelike deck-building game from Act I can be played endlessly, with the player able to unlock new cards and starting abilities to take on more difficult challenges. The mini-expansion was released on March 17, 2022.

Reception 

Inscryption received "generally favorable" reviews according to review aggregator Metacritic.

Rock Paper Shotgun praised the scale mechanic, writing that, "You lose and gain momentum, deliver killer blows, claw back from a near-loss by being aggressive...  It's a compelling twist". Destructoid liked the art style and the horror elements of the game, but criticized the later chapters' gameplay changes, stating, "Maybe it was a good idea to change things up before it had the chance to grow stale, it’s just nothing gripped me as firmly as the first chapter." PC Gamer's Jody Macgregor liked the beginning of Inscryption, specifically praising how the world feels "off-kilter and grotesque", but criticized the later part of the game "In its initial hours, Inscryption is an eerie delight full of mystery. That feeling fades long before it ends". Eurogamer enjoyed the visuals of the game, describing them as "a cursed reincarnation of something you'd play on a floppy disc in the '90s: a low fidelity-but-trying kind of adventure, but hijacked by some kind of evil and then twisted and gnarled by malevolence."

Inscryption was nominated for Best Indie Game and Best Sim/Strategy Game for The Game Awards 2021. Polygon named Inscryption their best game of 2021, while Time and Ars Technica listed Inscryption as one of their best games of 2021. In the 2021 Steam Awards, it was nominated for Most Innovative Gameplay. Inscryption won both the Game of the Year at the 22nd Game Developers Choice Awards and the Seumas McNally Grand Prize at the companion 2022 Independent Games Festival in addition to Excellence in Design, Narrative, and Audio; this is the first time a game won both top prizes. Inscryption had also been nominated for the Innovation Award for the Game Developers Choice Awards.

By January 2022, the game had sold more than one million copies.

Fans of the games have worked to physically replicate elements of Inscryption.

Awards and accolades

References

External links 
 Sacrifices Must be Made, the Ludum Dare game created by Mullins that became Inscryption 

2020s horror video games
2021 video games
British Academy Games Award for Game Design winners
Deck-building card games
Devolver Digital games
Digital collectible card games
Game Developers Choice Award for Game of the Year winners
Game jam video games
Independent Games Festival winners
Indie video games
Metafictional video games
Nintendo Switch games
PlayStation 4 games
PlayStation 5 games
Roguelike video games
Seumas McNally Grand Prize winners
Single-player video games
Video games about video games
Video games designed by Daniel Mullins
Video games developed in Canada
Windows games